Lockington is a village and former civil parish, now in the parish of Lockington-Hemington, in the North West Leicestershire district, in the county of Leicestershire, England. The village is close to the Derbyshire border.

Although there is not a rail station in the village, East Midlands Parkway opened nearby in 2008 at Ratcliffe-on-Soar which provides links to the Midland Main Line.

Lockington Hall in the village was the home of a branch of the Curzon family. In 1904 Henry Curzon of Lockington Hall was High Sheriff of Derbyshire.

In 1994 a hoard of Bronze Age items was discovered locally. The hoard consisted of the shards of two Beaker style pots, a copper based alloy dagger and two embossed gold-sheet armlets. These 4,000-year-old finds are now in the British Museum.

Civil parish 
On 1 April 1936 the parish of Hemington was merged with Knossington, on 14 May 1938 the parish was renamed "Lockington Hemington". In 1931 the parish of Lockington (prior to the merge) had a population of 186.

Notable people
John Gilbert Cooper, poet, was born here in 1722.

References

Villages in Leicestershire
Former civil parishes in Leicestershire
North West Leicestershire District